The Estadio Libertadores de América - Ricardo Enrique Bochini is a stadium located in the district of Avellaneda in Greater Buenos Aires, Argentina. Owned by Club Atlético Independiente, the stadium host the home matches of club's football team. The stadium was officially named only as recently as 2005, having been previously known simply as Estadio de Independiente or La Doble Visera de Cemento ("The double cement visor") because of the two roofs overhanging the spectators.

The stadium was built in 1928 and had a capacity of 52,823 with 27,863 seats. La Doble Visera ("The double cement visor"), as it was popularly known, was the first cement stadium built in South America, and would host all international finals Independiente played as local team. In October 2009 the stadium was reopened after having been refurbished. The current capacity of the venue is 42,069.

History 
The origins of the stadium can be traced to 1925, when Independiente acquired a 6-ha land on the corner of Alsina and Cordero, few meters from the Estadio Racing Club. One year later, the club started to build a cement stadium, the first in Argentina. Project by Engineer Federico Garófalo, who had designed a cement grandstand with roof with no columns (like a visor, inspired on Brazilian Hipódromo da Gávea) was the project chosen by the club.

The stadium was inaugurated on 4 March 1928, in a friendly match between Independiente and Uruguayan club Peñarol, with Governor of Buenos Aires, Valentín Vergara, as the guest of honour. The first official match played there was on 29 April 1928, when Independiente and Sportivo Buenos Aires tied 0–0. The first international match held at Independiente was on 25 May 1928, when Scottish club Motherwell F.C. played v a Liga Rosarina combined during the British club tour of Argentina. Other notable matches of the time include a 4–1 win over Spanish champion FC Barcelona.

The Argentina national football team played a Copa Newton match at Independiente in August 1928, being this the first match of the team at the venue. while the first Avellaneda derby was held in September 1928. One year later, another British club touring Argentina, Chelsea, played v Independiente at the stadium, in June 1929. Other Europeans teams that played there were Italian clubs Torino and Bologna. 

During the 1930s, the Independiente Stadium was a frecquent venue to host matches of Argentina national team. In 1938, the first lighting system was installed in the stadium, placing four columns on each border of the pitch. In 1960, the stadium was completely refurbished. Works included the construction of a second visor, new grandstands, seats, and cabins for radio broadcasters on the west side. Besides, an irrigation system was setup on the pitch. Due to that refurbishment, the Independiente stadium earned the nickname Doble Visera. In 1964, a new lighting system was installed, it consisted of six towers. A new grandstand would be built in 1970, on Cordero street side. 

At the end of 2005, president of Independiente, Julio Comparada, announced the project to build a new stadium. Works would be financed with the incoming (EU 23 million) from the sold of raising star Sergio Agüero to Spanish club Atlético Madrid. Agüero had played only 52 matches in Primera División before being traded. Other transactions made by the club (such as the selling of goalkeeper Oscar Ustari and striker Germán Denis) also helped finance the construction of the new venue, which also led some controversy due to its cost, estimated in US$ 50 million, which largely exceeded the initial cost announced in 2006.

In December 2006 the stadium was shuttered, and demolished the following year. The rebuilt stadium was inaugurated on 28 October 2009, in a match against Colón de Santa Fe of the Argentine Primera División championship (2009 Apertura). The new, European-style stadium has a capacity of roughly 42,069 seats. It also featured large digital screens, a restaurant with panoramic view of the pitch, a club museum, offices and conferential facilities, and a shopping centre.

In July 2014, one of the objectives was the completion of the court. Thus it was that, in the 2-1 victory against Racing Club on August 31 for the fifth date of the Transition Tournament, the "Bochini Alta" grandstand could be seen finished.

In May 2015, the construction of "Garganta 3" began and the "Bochini Baja" grandstand was also completed, plus the boxes and also the Press sector. On 16 December 2016 when facing Banfield, Independiente completely inaugurated the "Libertadores de América".

On December 5, 2021, as a tribute to whom is regarded as the greatest idol of the club, Ricardo Bochini, the stadium was renamed "Estadio Libertadores de América-Ricardo Bochini". Bochini, who has the record of matches played for the club (714 between 1972 and 1991), was honored before the 24th. round of 2021 Primera División, where Independiente played v San Lorenzo. Bochini also played for a representative of Independiente (formed by former players of the club) v a similar team of San Lorenzo, scoring one goal.

In September 17, 2022, the stadium hosted a rugby union match for the first time, when Argentina played v South Africa after the team was forced to switch the venue in the 5th. round of 2022 Rugby Championship because of the poor condition of José Amalfitani Stadium's pitch.

Argentina matches

Football team 
The Argentina national football team played several matches at Independiente stadium, mainly in the 1930s and 1940s, with the last match played there in 1961. Below is a list of those matches.

Rugby union team 
The Argentina national rugby team debuted at Independiente in September 2022

Notes

References

External links

 

Club Atlético Independiente
Liberadores de America
Copa América stadiums
Sports venues in Buenos Aires Province
1928 establishments in Argentina
Sports venues completed in 2009